Dr. Dinesh Parmar is an Indian politician and medical doctor. Parmar hails from Jamnagar. He graduated from M.P. Shah Medical College. He was named Minister of State of the Gujarat government in 1991.

Parmar was elected to the Gujarat Legislative Assembly in 1990 (as a Janata Dal candidate), 1995 (as an Indian National Congress candidate) and 2012. He was defeated in the 1998 and 2007 elections.

Parmar was fielded by Congress for the Kachchh seat in the 2014 Indian general election.

He was one of 57 Congress MLAs suspended for wearing slogans against Bharatiya Janata Party president Amit Shah.

References

Living people
Janata Dal politicians
Indian National Congress politicians
United Progressive Alliance candidates in the 2014 Indian general election
Gujarat MLAs 1990–1995
Gujarat MLAs 2012–2017
Gujarat MLAs 1995–1998
Year of birth missing (living people)